NGC 2608 (also known as Arp 12) is a barred spiral galaxy located 93 million light-years away in the constellation Cancer (the Crab). It is 62,000 light-years across, and about 60% of the width of the Milky Way. It is considered a grand design spiral galaxy and is classified as SB(s)b, meaning that the galaxy's arms wind moderately (neither tightly nor loosely) around the prominent central bar.

It was classified under "galaxies with split arms" in the 1966 Atlas of Peculiar Galaxies by Halton Arp, who noted that the "nucleus may be double or superposed star".
NGC 2608 is now considered to be a pair of interacting galaxies.

Supernovae 
SN 1920A was discovered by German astronomer Max Wolf (1863–1932). It peaked at magnitude 11.7 on 17 December 1920. Its visual magnitude implies an overluminous bolometric magnitude; SN 1920A has since been classified as anomalous and is believed to be the result of "a completely different explosion mechanism."

SN 2001bg was discovered on 9 May 2001 (May 8.943 UT) by noted supernova hunter Tom Boles of Coddenham, Suffolk, England, with a 0.36 m Schmidt-Cassegrain telescope. When first observed it was magnitude 14; it later peaked at around 13.7. Its spectrum indicates that it is a typical Type Ia supernova.

References

External links 

Barred spiral galaxies
Cancer (constellation)
012
2608
024111